Bookmice is a children's television series about a public library secretly inhabited by three fun-loving mice. It is a spinoff of The Magic Library. It would often also showcase Eastern European cartoons such as Jak Bzuk a Ťuk putovali za sluníčkem and others. The series originally aired on TVOntario in Canada.

Description
Norbert, Zazi and Leon, three fun-loving mice, live secretly behind the walls of the neighborhood library. Only Lee, a lonely boy who has just moved into the area, and an interloping, decrepit cat know of the existence of the Bookmice. Later in the series, the mice are discovered by three new children, Alysha, Jason, and Luke, who become their secret friends. Humor, wonder, stories, music, and delightful animation are present in the everyday adventures of the mice, as they explore the wondrous world of books – and the library's many friends and activities. Along with encouraging a love of reading, programs promote social values, as children learn about helping others, the importance of honesty, and overcoming fears.

Characters
Norbert (voiced by Nina Keogh) — a mouse
Leon (voiced by Karen Valleau) — a mouse
Zazi (voiced by Trish Leeper) — a mouse
Kate (Stéphanie Broschart) — the assistant librarian
Exit — a ginger cat with green eyes. Seeks to catch the mice. Later named Exit after the first word he could read. (performed by Stephen Brathwaite; voiced by Dan Hennessey)
The Wizard of Wonder — also known as the "Wiz" of Wonder; later adopts a human secret identity, calling himself "Mr. Flower" after the flower on his coat. (Eric Fink) 
Luke (Andrew Sardella)
Lee (Andrew Rosos)
Jason (Ari Magder)
Alysha (Erica Luttrell)
Cosmo (Jack Duffy)
Officer Martinez (Stefanie Samuels)
The Wicked Witch (Marilyn Boyle)

Animation narrator
 Diane Fabian

Episodes

Cartoons shown on Bookmice
 The Car with the Red Heart (original title: Autícko s cerveným srdcem)
 Cepecek the Water Gnome
 An Apple Goes a Rolling
 Bzuk and Tuk (original title: Jak Bzuk a Ťuk putovali za sluníčkem)
 Kaspar and the Kangaroo

See also
 The Magic Library (1985–1990)
 Return to the Magic Library (2004–2014)

References

External links

1990s Canadian children's television series
1992 Canadian television series debuts
1997 Canadian television series endings
Canadian television series with live action and animation
Canadian television spin-offs
Canadian television shows featuring puppetry
TVO original programming
Television series about mice and rats
Television shows filmed in Toronto